Łukasz Sosin (born 7 May 1977) is Polish former professional footballer who played as a striker. Besides Poland, he has played in Cyprus.

Club career
Sosin was born in Kraków, Poland.

In the beginning of his career he started out as a sweeper and later became a striker.

Sosin came to Cyprus in 2002 and joined Apollon Limassol from Odra Wodzisław Śląski. In 2007, he moved from Apollon Limassol to Anorthosis Famagusta FC. In his career he played also for Wisła Kraków.

Sosin was top goalscorer of the Cypriot First Division three years in a row (2003–04, 2004–05, 2005–06) while playing for Apollon Limassol. During 2007–08 campaign he was joint top scorer (the other being David da Costa of Doxa Katokopia. He won the Cypriot Championship twice (Apollon Limassol 2005–06, Anorthosis Famagusta 2007–08), and twice the Super-Cup (Apollon Limassol in 2006, Anorthosis Famagusta in 2007). On 3 January 2010, AO Kavala have signed the former Polish international and Anorthosis Famagusta forward. The next season, he moved to Aris Limassol signing a two-year contract.

International career
Sosin also played 4 times with the Poland national football team, scoring 2 goals in his debut a friendly against Saudi Arabia in March 2006. Sosin did not regularly get called up for Poland since he fell out with Dutch coach Leo Beenhakker.

His last game was against San Marino in April 2009, where he struck the post, and provided an assist on Marek Saganowski's goal.

International goals

References

External links
 
 
 Profile at PZPN

1977 births
Living people
Footballers from Kraków
Association football forwards
Polish footballers
Poland international footballers
Ekstraklasa players
Cypriot First Division players
Cypriot Second Division players
Super League Greece players
Hutnik Nowa Huta players
Odra Wodzisław Śląski players
Wisła Kraków players
Apollon Limassol FC players
Anorthosis Famagusta F.C. players
Kavala F.C. players
Aris Limassol FC players
Polish expatriate footballers
Expatriate footballers in Cyprus
Expatriate footballers in Greece
Polish expatriate sportspeople in Cyprus
Polish expatriate sportspeople in Greece